Serge Sazonoff (October 8, 1915 – January 24, 2012), also known as Serge de Sazo, was a Russian born French photographer.

Biography
Serge de Sazo was born at Stavropol (in the province of Don). His father was a colonel in the Cossacks and his mother was the daughter of an industrialist. After living with his family in Turkey, Greece and the United States, he arrived in Paris in 1922 at the age of seven.

He got his first job in 1933 in the magazine VU and there he met and quickly became the assistant of Gaston Paris.
1936: he left VU for the Universal press agency where he submitted his first reports.
1937: he collaborated with Charles Rado, then joined Raymond Grosset who founded the Rapho agency.
1938: Sergeant with the 8 Zouave, he is demobilized in 1940 and he started working as a freelance reporter for cinema reviews.
1944: He was a privileged witness (he lived on Rue de Rivoli) as the resistance liberated the town hall. Armed with his Rolleiflex, he recorded the most spectacular battle of the liberation of Paris. His pictures were published all over the world, building his reputation.
1945: Parisian night life began again. Cabaret, jazz, music-hall, cinema, the creative artistic activity of the 1950s overflowed with a phenomenal vitality. Journalist during the day, he covers lighter events at night. His reports, his pin-ups and his nudes were regularly published in the famous magazine Paris-Hollywood and in several light magazines after the war.
1950: it was while working on a project about naturism on the island of Levant that he met J. A. Foex who introduced him to the undersea world. Enthralled by the gracious movements of the weightless body and wanting to photograph it, he invented a waterproof casing for his Rolleiflex. He used this home-made casing to take the first undersea photographs, with his wife as the subject. After a few minor improvements he photographed a troop of dancers performing under water. A new field of photography was born “The Mermaids of Levant” was an immediate success. His mentor then introduced him to the more classic techniques of undersea diving. He was fascinated by the still untouched world of flora and wild life.
1954: along with J. A. Foex and Roger Brand, he publish the first French magazine dedicated to the undersea world “L’aventure sous-marine”. From then on, he divided his time between this new passion and his job as a press photographer.

Having retired to the French Alps in the mid 1980s, de Sazo died on 24 January 2012.

Publications 
Nus, photographies d'André De Dienes, Serge De Sazo et Marcel Véronèse, Album No.7, Société Parisienne, 1950
L'île aux sirènes de J.A. Foex, photographies de S. de Sazo, Édition Optimistes, 1953
Mon album des profondeurs de Gilbert Doukan, photographies de S. de Sazo, Édition Elsevier,1954
Exploration sous-marine de la Bible de J.A. Foex, photographies de S. de Sazo, Édition France-Empire, 1955
Riviera, la nuit, Robert Jacques, photographs by Pierre Manciet and Serge de Sazo, La Pensée Moderne, 1959
Bonjour Paris by François Brigneau, ouvrage collectif : S. de Sazo, Jacqueline Nièpce, Robert Doisneau etc., Des Éditions Sun, 1969
Paris, ses poètes, ses chansons, Serge de Sazo and Bernard Delvaille, Éditions Seghers, 1977
Femme sorciére !, photographies de Serge de Sazo, ouvrage collectif, Édition Ion, 2013
French Maidens, by Charles Sennet with a photographic supplement by Serge de Sazo, The Naturist, London.

References

External links
 Official website

1915 births
2012 deaths
French photographers
People from Stavropol
White Russian emigrants to France